Frank L. Ridley is an American film and television actor. Born into a musical family in Michigan, he originally trained as an opera singer with Richard Conrad. After attending Boston Conservatory of Music, he started his career as a regular member of Sarah Caldwell's Opera Company of Boston.

Career 
His television career started when he was cast as Terry Mulligan in the Showtime network series Brotherhood. His other TV work includes roles on House of Cards, Orange is the New Black, Alpha House, Olive Kitteridge, The Night Of, The Leftovers, and 30 Rock.

He also can be seen in a variety of films including Inside Llewyn Davis, Birdman, and The Judge.

Honest Gil Fulbright

Honest Gil Fulbright is a satirical political candidate portrayed by Frank Ridley. Fulbright originally "ran" for the U.S. Senate in 2014 as an "honest politician for Kentucky" on behalf of RepresentUs.

Ridley has portrayed Fulbright on CNN, The Today Show, Fox & Friends, Al Jazeera, The Washington Post, and The Huffington Post.

Fulbright's campaign got a powerful boost when noted artist Shepard Fairey reimagined his iconic Barack Obama "Hope" poster as a Gil Fulbright "SOLD" poster to help raise funds for the finance-reform-minded satirical campaign. His campaign message was "I'm only in this thing for the money, but at least I'm honest about it."

Filmography

Films

Television

Video games

Awards and nominations

References

 https://www.rockstargames.com/reddeadredemption2/credits
 https://www.giantbomb.com/pharaoh/3030-17680/credits/

External links

Living people
American male film actors
American male television actors
People from Michigan
Year of birth missing (living people)
American male stage actors
21st-century American male actors